The 2005 European Speed Skating Championships were held at Thialf in Heerenveen, Netherlands, from 7 January until 9 January 2005. Jochem Uytdehaage and  Anni Friesinger won the titles.

Men's championships

Day 1

Day 2

Allround results 

NQ = Not qualified for the 10000 m (only the best 12 are qualified)
DNS = Did not start
DQ = Disqualified

Source: ISU

Women's championships

Day 1

Day 2

Rules 
All participating skaters are allowed to skate the first three distances; 12 skaters may take part on the fourth distance. These 12 skaters are determined by taking the standings on the longest of the first three distances, as well as the samalog standings after three distances, and comparing these lists as follows:

 Skaters among the top 12 on both lists are qualified.
 To make up a total of 12, skaters are then added in order of their best rank on either list. Samalog standings take precedence over the longest-distance standings in the event of a tie.

See also 
 2005 World Allround Speed Skating Championships

References 

European Speed Skating Championships, 2005
2005 European Allround
European Allround, 2005
European Speed Skating Championships, 2005
2005 in Dutch sport